Freydoun Malkom Khan (also spelt as Firidun; 1875 - 1954) was an Iranian fencer. He competed in the individual épée event at the 1900 Summer Olympics.

References

External links
 

1875 births
Year of death missing
Iranian male épée fencers
Olympic fencers of Iran
Fencers at the 1900 Summer Olympics
Sportspeople from London
People of Qajar Iran
Date of birth missing
Place of death missing